Brockless is a surname. Notable people with the surname include:

Brian Brockless (1926–1995), British composer, organist, and conductor 
Pauline Brockless (1929–2015), British soprano 
 Tommy Brockless, fictional character on Torchwood